Abdulaziz Makin (born 29 June 2001) is a Saudi Arabian professional footballer who plays as a midfielder for Pro League side Damac.

Career
Makin started his career at the youth teams of hometown club Damac. He joined rivals Abha on 28 January 2018 where he spent 6 months before returning to Damac. Makin signed his first professional contract with Damac on 30 August 2021. He made his debut on 5 February 2022 by coming off the bench in the league match against Al-Faisaly.

References

External links
 

Living people
2001 births
People from 'Asir Province
Association football midfielders
Saudi Arabian footballers
Damac FC players
Abha Club players
Saudi Professional League players